Kelly Lee Stinnett (born February 14, 1970) is a retired Major League Baseball catcher. He played all or parts of 14 seasons in the majors, from  until .

High school years
Stinnett attended Lawton High School in Lawton, Oklahoma and was a letterman in football and baseball. He was an All-State selection in baseball and in football and he led his football team to the Oklahoma Class 5A State Championship. He played on this championship team with 2 other professional athletes – James Trapp and Will Shields. Trapp went to the NFL and played for the Raiders and Shields played for the Kansas City Chiefs.

College and pro ball
He attended Seminole Junior College in Oklahoma, where in his freshman year he was All-Conference and All-Region after leading all junior college players with 30 home runs and 124 RBI. In his sophomore year, he was National Junior College Player of the Year and a first-team All-American. That year, he had a batting average of .399 and had 22 home runs and 97 RBI, leading his team to a Third-place finish in the Junior College World Series. After college, he spent one year with an independent team in Upstate New York named the Watertown Indians.

He was drafted by the Cleveland Indians in the  amateur draft as the 279th overall pick, and was selected by the New York Mets in the  Rule 5 draft on December 13, 1993. He began his first season the following spring, on April 5, with the Mets.

He made a return to the Diamondbacks on December 13, 2004, when he was signed to a minor league contract. Stinnett made his return to the major leagues on May 28, in a 5-4 win against the Los Angeles Dodgers. In late November 2005, Stinnett signed a one-year deal with the New York Yankees.

Stinnett was designated for assignment by the Yankees on July 26, after the Yankees traded for Phillies' back-up catcher Sal Fasano. On August 24, 2006, Stinnett signed a minor league contract with the Mets. He made his return to Shea Stadium as a Met on September 9, 2006 against the Los Angeles Dodgers, and went 1-3. He finished September with a .083 batting average, and was not included on the 2006 New York Mets postseason roster. On February 17, he signed a minor league deal with the Los Angeles Dodgers. On June 3, 2007, he was picked up by the St. Louis Cardinals for cash considerations.

On June 28, 2013, Stinnett was named manager of the Montezuma Federals, a minor league team based in Prescott, Arizona, with the Freedom Pro Baseball League.

On April 22, 2015, Stinnett was named the head coach of the Watertown Bucks in their inaugural season in the East Coast Baseball League.  That league has since folded, but four of the teams banded together to form a new league, the North Country Baseball League, and that's where the Bucks will play. Stinnett resigned July 5, 2015 as manager of the Watertown Bucks.

, Stinnett is currently the head baseball coach at Park University's Gilbert, Arizona, campus.

References

External links

Baseball players from Oklahoma
1970 births
Living people
Seminole State Trojans baseball players
Sportspeople from Lawton, Oklahoma
Major League Baseball catchers
New York Mets players
Milwaukee Brewers players
Arizona Diamondbacks players
Cincinnati Reds players
Philadelphia Phillies players
Kansas City Royals players
New York Yankees players
St. Louis Cardinals players
Canton-Akron Indians players
Charlotte Knights players
New Orleans Zephyrs players
Louisville Bats players
Tucson Sidewinders players
Norfolk Tides players
Las Vegas 51s players
Memphis Redbirds players